Elandsrand (Afrikaans for "eland ridge") is a small mining town approximately  outside Carletonville next to Blyvooruitzicht.

History

Trapped miners event of October 2007

On 3 October 2007, 3,200 mine workers were trapped in the gold mine after an accident blocked a deep (2.2 km) shaft near the bottom. Rescuers used an adjacent shaft to rescue the miners, a spokeswoman for the mine's owner, Harmony Gold Mining, said.

It has twin shafts very close to each other, one being a production shaft, the other a service shaft for men and equipment. The incident trapping the miners occurred in the service shaft when a 15-meter section of compressed air pipe burst and fell to the shaft bottom, in the process damaging steel shaft guides, and electrical lines which cut off power to the hoist on the service cage. Because the service shaft became inoperable, miners were brought up using the production shaft, after changing out the skips for a cage. The service cage would not be able to fit into the hoisting compartments in the production shaft due to different shaft sizes, and different compartment configurations. Due to this fact a smaller cage with a slower hoisting speed was used in the skip compartments. As a result, evacuation of the trapped miners took longer than had the miners been able to use the service shaft as an egress. Eventually all the miners were rescued unharmed from the mine.

See also
 Kusasalethu mine
 Merafong City Local Municipality

References

Populated places in the Merafong City Local Municipality